Peter Mellars is a New Zealand former rugby league footballer and administrator who represented New Zealand. His son, Vince, is a professional rugby league player.

Playing career
Mellars played for Petone and represented Wellington. In 1982 he was selected for the New Zealand national rugby league team however he did not play in any Test matches.

Later years
Mellars is the chairman of the Petone Panthers club and also served as the manager of the Wellington Orcas in the final year of the Bartercard Cup.

References

Living people
New Zealand rugby league players
New Zealand national rugby league team players
Wellington rugby league team players
Petone Panthers players
Rugby league props
New Zealand rugby league administrators
Year of birth missing (living people)
Place of birth missing (living people)